Life's Crossroads is a 1928 American silent drama film directed by Edgar Lewis and starring Gladys Hulette, Mahlon Hamilton and William Conklin. It is also known by the alternative title of The Silken Lady.

A man and a woman who strongly dislike each other are the only survivors of a shipwreck on a tropical coastline.

Cast
 Gladys Hulette as The Lady 
 Mahlon Hamilton as The Man 
 William Conklin as The Stranger 
 William J. Humphrey as The Consul

References

Bibliography
 Munden, Kenneth White. The American Film Institute Catalog of Motion Pictures Produced in the United States, Part 1. University of California Press, 1997.

External links

1928 films
1928 drama films
Silent American drama films
Films directed by Edgar Lewis
American silent feature films
1920s English-language films
American black-and-white films
1920s American films